The following is a partial list of Palestinian civilian casualties in the Second Intifada. The portion of the 4,281 Palestinians killed since the beginning of the Second Intifada that were civilians is disputed. B'tselem claims that 2,038 were civilians. Some sources assert that B'tselem's definition of a civilian is too broad and includes Palestinians killed while attacking Israeli forces. In 2009, the Israeli conservative historian Benny Morris stated in his retrospective book One States, Two States that about one third of the Palestinian deaths had been civilians. A study conducted by Israel's International Institute for Counter-Terrorism (ICT) concluded that the majority of Palestinian fatalities have been combatants. 609 Palestinian civilians were killed by other Palestinians.


List

See also
List of Israeli civilian casualties in the Second Intifada
Children in the Israeli–Palestinian conflict

References

+
Palestinian civilian casualties